The following lists events that happened during 1990 in Zaire.

Incumbents 
 President – Mobutu Sese Seko
 Prime Minister – Léon Kengo wa Dondo, then Lunda Bululu

Events

See also

 Zaire
 History of the Democratic Republic of the Congo

References

Sources

 
Zaire
Zaire